Justice Ernest Nee Pobee Sowah  (born 23 September 1921, date of death unknown) was the Chief Justice of Ghana from 1986 to 1990.

Early life
He was born on September 23, 1921, to James Durnford Sowah to the Royal Stool House of Kpobi We, Kowe, La and Margaret Mansah Quao of Adedinkpo, Accra. He entered Achimota School in 1936.

Career
He presided over the case brought by Amaoako Tuffuor, a Ghanaian citizen, when the People's National Party government of Hilla Limann attempted to replace Justice Fred Kwasi Apaloo as the Chief Justice of Ghana by vetting him. He ruled that Apaloo was the Chief Justice on the coming into force of the 1979 Ghanaian constitution and was thus the incumbent Chief Justice.

He went on to succeed Apaloo in 1986. This was during the era of the military Provisional National Defence Council (PNDC) government. He was retained as Chief Justice beyond the compulsory retirement age by the PNDC, a move which was controversial at the time.

Personal life
The 2002 book "Who Killed the Judges?" by police officer Jacob Yidana notes that Justice Sowah is deceased, but doesn't state when he died.

Publications
1981 - Non-Aligned Nations, 13 Case W. Res. J. Int'l L. 439 (1981)

Notes and references

See also
Chief Justice of Ghana
List of judges of the Supreme Court of Ghana
Supreme Court of Ghana

1921 births
Year of death missing
Alumni of Achimota School
Ga-Adangbe people
Ghanaian Christians
20th-century Ghanaian judges
Justices of the Supreme Court of Ghana